Darrell Y. Hamamoto is an American writer, academic, and specialist in U.S. media and ethnic studies. He was a scholar of Asian American media and professor for almost 23 years at the University of California, Davis before retiring in 2018.

Education 
Hamamoto received his education at CSU Long Beach, Bowling Green State University and UC Irvine.

Influential works 
He created a 50-minute erotic film named Skin on Skin, which starred Asian American actors and actresses and addresses the desexualization of Asian American males. Hamamoto created another piece called Yellowcaust: A Patriot Act, which includes clips from Skin on Skin and information regarding atrocities committed against Asian Americans in the U.S.'s history.  His work has generated controversy for producing porn movies as research.

Hamamoto was featured in both The Daily Show and Masters of the Pillow, which is a documentary about Skin on Skin.

Conspiracy Theories 
Professor Hamamoto has promoted several conspiracy theories in both his academic and personal life. He has made several appearances on the far-right InfoWars radio program, hosted by Alex Jones, where he has promoted the white genocide theory, as well as a theory that U.S. Senator John Kerry and the Obama Foundation were involved to a plot to split Hurricane Lane into two separate storms via a secret directed-energy weapon housed in Antarctica. Professor Hamamoto also made a 2014 appearance on the Red Ice Radio program.

Books 
Nervous Laughter: Television Situation Comedy and Liberal Democratic Ideology, Praeger, 1991
Monitored Peril: Asian Americans and the Politics of TV Representation, University of Minnesota Press, 1994
New American Destinies: A Reader in Contemporary Asian and Latino Immigration, Routledge, 1996
Countervisions: Asian American Film Criticism (Asian American History and Culture), Temple University Press, 2000
Servitors of Empire: Studies in the Dark Side of Asian America, Trine Day, 2014

References 

Living people
American academics of Japanese descent
American orientalists
American writers of Japanese descent
Bowling Green State University alumni
California State University, Long Beach alumni
East Asian studies scholars
University of California, Davis faculty
University of California, Irvine alumni
Year of birth missing (living people)